Lieutenant General Sir Peter Walter Graham  (born 14 March 1937) was General Officer Commanding Scotland.

Military career
Brought up in Fyvie in Aberdeenshire and educated at St Paul's School in London and the Royal Military Academy, Sandhurst, Graham was commissioned into the Gordon Highlanders in 1956. He went on to be adjutant of the 1st Bn of his regiment in 1963 was mentioned in despatches for his services in Borneo during the Indonesia–Malaysia confrontation in 1966. In 1974 he was appointed military assistant to General Sir Cecil Blacker, the Adjutant-General to the Forces. 

He was made commanding officer of 1st Bn the Gordon Highlanders 1976 and chief of staff at 3rd Armoured Division in 1978. He went on to command the Ulster Defence Regiment in 1982 and was mentioned in despatches for his services in Northern Ireland in 1984. He became deputy military secretary at the Ministry of Defence in 1985 and General Officer Commanding Eastern District in 1987. In 1989 he was made Commandant of the Royal Military Academy Sandhurst. He became General Officer Commanding Scotland and Governor of Edinburgh Castle in 1991 and retired in 1993.

Family
In 1963 he married Alison Mary Morren; they went on to have three sons. His brother is the former Lord Mayor of London, Sir Alexander Graham.

Scottish Independence Referendum

He is a supporter of a 'No' vote in the 2014 referendum and is listed as a speaker at the launch of the Better Together Buchan campaign group on 9 November 2013.

References

 

|-

|-
 

1937 births
Living people
People educated at St Paul's School, London
Ulster Defence Regiment officers
Knights Commander of the Order of the Bath
Commanders of the Order of the British Empire
Gordon Highlanders officers
British Army lieutenant generals
Commandants of Sandhurst
British Army personnel of the Indonesia–Malaysia confrontation
Graduates of the Royal Military Academy Sandhurst
People from Formartine